Continuum may refer to:

 Continuum (measurement), theories or models that explain gradual transitions from one condition to another without abrupt changes

Mathematics
 Continuum (set theory), the real line or the corresponding cardinal number
 Linear continuum, any ordered set that shares certain properties of the real line
 Continuum (topology), a nonempty compact connected metric space (sometimes Hausdorff space)
 Continuum hypothesis, the hypothesis that no infinite sets are larger than the integers but smaller than the real numbers
 Cardinality of the continuum, a cardinal number that represents the size of the set of real numbers

Science
 Continuum morphology, in plant morphology, underlining the continuum between morphological categories
 Continuum concept, in psychology
 Continuum mechanics, in physics, deals with continuous matter
 Space-time continuum, any mathematical model that combines space and time into a single continuum
 Continuum theory of specific heats of solids, see Debye model
 Triune continuum, trinity of continual representations in general system modeling defined in the theory of triune continuum, used in the Triune continuum paradigm
 Continuous spectrum, referred to simply as the continuum in contrast to discrete spectral lines

Arts and entertainment

Film and television
 Continuum (film), or I'll Follow You Down, a 2013 Canadian film
 Stargate: Continuum, a 2008 direct-to-DVD film in the Stargate franchise
 Continuum (TV series), a 2012–2015 Canadian science fiction series
 "Continuum" (American Horror Story), a 2013 television episode
 Q Continuum, an extended universe in the fictional Star Trek universe

Games
 Continuum (game client), a game client for the SubSpace computer game
 Continuum (role-playing game), a time travel role-playing game 
 The Continuum, a browser-based fantasy collectible wargame
 Alpha Waves, released in North America as Continuum, a 1990 3D video game
 Command & Conquer: Continuum, a cancelled MMORPG in the Command & Conquer series

Music
 Continuum (Ligeti), a composition for harpsichord by György Ligeti, 1968
 Continuum Fingerboard, a continuous pitch performance controller developed by Haken Audio

Performers
 Continuum (chamber ensemble), an American classical chamber music ensemble
 Continuum (jazz group), with Slide Hampton, Jimmy Heath, Ron Carter, Art Taylor, Kenny Barron
 Continuum (music project), a collaboration between Steven Wilson and Dirk Serries

Albums
 Continuum (The Components album), 2018
 Continuum (Fly to the Sky album), 2014
 Continuum (John Mayer album), 2006
 Continuum (Mentallo & The Fixer album) or the title song, 1995
 Continuum (Nik Bärtsch album), 2016
 Continuum (Prototype album), 2006
 Continuum (Rainer Brüninghaus album) or the title song, 1983
 Continuum (Ray Drummond album), 1994
 The Continuum (album), by Ethnic Heritage Ensemble, or the title song, 1997

Songs
 "Continuum", by At the Drive-In from In•ter a•li•a, 2017
 "Continuum", by Defecation from Intention Surpassed, 2003
 "Continuum", by Erra from Drift, 2016
 "Continuum", by Jaco Pastorius from Jaco Pastorius, 1976
 "Continuum", by Opeth from In Cauda Venenum, 2019
 "Continuum", by Tycho from Epoch, 2016

Print
 Continuum (journal), an academic journal of media and cultural studies
 Continuum (magazine), a 1992–2001 pseudoscientific magazine
 Continüm Comics, a 1988–1994 American comic book publisher
 Continuum International Publishing Group, an independent academic publisher in London and New York
 Continuum, a 1974–1975 series of science fiction anthologies edited by Roger Elwood
 Continuum, a journal published by the American Academy of Neurology

Other arts and entertainment
 Continuum (art fair), an annual event in West Palm Beach, Florida, US
 Continuum (sculpture), a 1976 public artwork by Charles O. Perry

Other
 Continuum (dream), a type of false awakening
 Dialect continuum, the transition of one language to another through speech variations
 Continuing Anglican movement, a.k.a. Continuum, dissenting churches who have left the Anglican Communion
 Shailesh J. Mehta School of Management#Continuum, the rolling seminar series, an annual event at the school 
 Consciousness Continuum, or the Mind Stream in Buddhism
 Continuum Morphology, an interpretation of morphology in biology proposed by Rolf Sattler
 Apache Continuum, a continuous integration server for building Java-based projects
 Windows 10 feature, that allows a 2-in-1 PC to transition from a traditional desktop UI to a tablet UI

See also
 Continuity (disambiguation)
 Kontinuum, Icelandic music band
 Kontinuum (album), a 2007 album by Klaus Schulze